Thalia was the name of two motor vessels operated by Dampfschiffahrts-Gesellschaft Neptun (Neptun Line).

, requisitioned in 1939 by the Kriegsmarine, surrendered to the United Kingdom in 1945 and renamed Empire Consett
, sold in 1971 to Greece

Ship names